The following is a list of paintings by Rembrandt that are accepted as autograph by the Rembrandt Research Project. For other catalogues raisonnés of Rembrandt, see the "Rembrandt" navigation box below.

See also
List of etchings by Rembrandt
List of drawings by Rembrandt

Sources

 A Corpus of Rembrandt Paintings I (1625–1631). Bruyn, J., Haak, B., Levie, S.H., van Thiel, P.J.J. 1982. .
 A Corpus of Rembrandt Paintings II (1631–1634). Bruyn, J., Haak, B., Levie, S.H., van Thiel, P.J.J. 1986. .
 A Corpus of Rembrandt Paintings III (1635–1642). Bruyn, J., Haak, B., Levie, S.H., van Thiel, P.J.J., van de Wetering, E. (Ed.). 1990. .
 A Corpus of Rembrandt Paintings IV (Self-Portraits). van de Wetering, Ernst (Ed.). Springer. 2005. .
 A Corpus of Rembrandt Paintings V (The Small-Scale History Paintings). van de Wetering, Ernst (Ed.). Springer. 2010. .
 A Corpus of Rembrandt Paintings VI: Rembrandt’s Paintings Revisited – A Complete Survey. Ernst van de Wetering. Springer. 2014. .

References

 
Rembrandt